

Concrete recycling is the use of rubble from demolished concrete structures. Recycling is cheaper and more ecological than trucking rubble to a landfill. Crushed rubble can be used for road gravel, revetments, retaining walls, landscaping gravel, or raw material for new concrete. Large pieces can be used as bricks or slabs, or incorporated with new concrete into structures, a material called urbanite.

Importance 
Concrete is one of the most widely used materials globally. In 2009, the International Energy Agency reported that ~25 Gt of concrete is used each year globally, which is equivalent to > 3.8 tons of concrete per person per year. The demand of construction aggregate was projected to reach 48.3 billion metric tons by 2015; the highest consumption was to be in Asia and the Pacific. Demolition to make space for new structures generates a large volume of waste. Among various types of construction and demolition waste, concrete waste accounts for 50% of the total waste generation. Five major causes of huge generation of concrete waste are over-ordering, damage during transportation, loss during installation, poor workmanship, and change of design. The most common way to dispose this waste is to dump it in a landfill, which can pollute the air and water, since it is strongly alkaline. This, along with the resource use of this construction, has caused many countries to consider the importance of recycling of demolition waste.

Benefits include:

 Conserves natural resources compared gravel mining.
 Reduces pollution from transport to landfills and dumps
Reduces costs of transporting materials and waste
Saves landfill space
 Creates employment

Process 

Re-purposing urbanite (concrete rubble pieces) involves selecting and transporting the pieces, and using them as slabs or bricks. The pieces can be shaped, for example using a chisel; this can be labor-intensive.

Crushing involves removing trash, wood and paper; removing metals such as rebar, using magnets and other devices, to be recycled separately; sorting the aggregate by size; crushing it using a crushing machine; and removing other particulates by methods such as hand-picking and water flotation.

Crushing at the construction site using portable crushers is cheaper and causes less pollution than transporting material to and from a quarry. Large road-portable plants can crush concrete and asphalt rubble at 600 tons per hour. These systems normally include a side discharge conveyor, a screening plant, and a return conveyor from the screen back to the crusher for re-crushing large chunks. Compact, self-contained crushers can crush up to 150 tons per hour and fit into tighter areas. Crusher attachments to construction equipment such as excavators can crush up to 100 tons per hour and make crushing of smaller volumes economical.

To produce clean aggregates from crushed concrete waste, very careful dismantling and demolishing is needed to keep the concrete stream away from other materials that would diminish its quality. Once separated, the broken concrete is then sent to a wet recycling process, where the coarse fraction of broken concrete is washed to produce clean aggregate, whereas the residue generated from the washing process is sent to landfill in the form of sludge.

Uses 
Large pieces of concrete rubble (urbanite) can be used in walls as building stones, as slabs in walkways, or as riprap revetments to reduce stream bank erosion.

Small pieces are used as gravel for new construction projects. Sub-base gravel is laid as the lowest layer in a road, with fresh concrete or asphalt poured over it.  The US Federal Highway Administration may use such techniques to build new highways from the materials of old highways. Concrete pavements can be broken in place and used as a base layer for an asphalt pavement through a process called rubblization.

Crushed concrete free of contaminants can be used as raw material (sometimes mixed with natural aggregate) to make new concrete.

Well-graded and aesthetically pleasing materials can be used as landscaping stone and mulch.

Wire gabions (cages), can be filled with crushed concrete and stacked as retaining walls or privacy walls (instead of fencing).

Chemical Recycling of Concrete Waste

Soil Amendment and Stabilization 
Improper disposal and treatment of concrete waste negatively affect soil, but proper treatment and recycling processes can be used to amend and stabilize soil. In general, alkali-activated mixtures improve and stabilize soil through cation exchange, hydration reactions, and enhanced pozzolanic reactions. Ca2+ ions in an alkali-activated mixture exchanges with other metal ions, decreasing electric double layers and increasing flocculation, making soil more granular and friable. Alkali-activated mixtures improve soil by sorbing the water in the soil through hydration reactions, which decreases the water content in the soil and improves soft soil with a high moisture content. Finally, the dissociation of calcium oxide in water in the soil increases electrolyte concentrations and pH, and hence SiO2 and Al2O3 dissolve more readily and promotes pozzolanic reactions. Materials such as Portland cement, fly ash, and lime are already used extensively to amend and stabilize soil, so the same concept can be extended to concrete waste, which is itself an alkali-activated mixture. In general, studies have shown that the cementitious material of concrete waste that is added to weak soil causes hydration reactions that increase the soil pH, amount of Ca2+, and amount of free Ca(OH)2 that could react with SiO2 and Al2O3 through pozzolanic reactions that improve soil.

Construction Material Production 
Concrete waste contains abundant silicon and some aluminum, so they can be used to synthesize geopolymers. Geopolymeric binder combined with metakaolin can yield material with desired silicon, aluminum, and calcium contents. Geopolymer concrete from waste concrete has been analyzed, and it has been suggested that it could be used in applications that require moderately strong concrete, thermally insulating concrete, lightweight concrete, and bricks or blocks.

Water and Gas Treatment 
Concrete waste that is rich in alkaline calcium compounds can be used to remove and recover various elements from an aqueous solution. Waste concrete has been used as a sorbent to remove phosphorus from wastewater after the removal of excess sludge in sewage treatment plants. Concrete waste may also be used as an inexpensive gas treatment agent. This would offer advantages over using conventional gas treatment agents because concrete waste is cheap and produced in large amounts. Research has shown that waste concrete can contribute to the sorption of NO2, SO2, and Fluorine gas.

Precautions 
There have been concerns about the recycling of painted concrete due to possible lead content. The Army Corps of Engineers' Construction Engineering Research Laboratory (CERL) and others have studied the risks, and concluded that concrete with lead-based paint should be safely used as fill without an impervious cover as long as it is covered by soil.

Some experiments showed that recycled concrete is less strong and durable than concrete from natural aggregate. This can be remedied by mixing in materials such as fly ash.

References

External links
 Construction Materials Recycling Association
 Information About The Benefits on Concrete Recycling
 Omer Haciomeroglu's ERO Concrete Recycling Robot
 Strength and Durability Evaluation of Recycled Aggregate Concrete
 Use of aggregates from recycled construction and demolition waste in concrete

Concrete
Recycling by material
Water conservation